"Da' Dip" is a song written and recorded by American freestyle artist Freak Nasty. It was released in 1996 as the lead single from his second album, Controversee...That's Life...And That's the Way It Is. To date, "Da' Dip" is Freak Nasty's only top forty hit.

Upon its initial release in mid-1996, "Da' Dip" failed to make an impact on the Billboard charts, charting low on both the R&B and rap charts. The song, however, managed to break through into the mainstream the following year, reaching number 15 on the Billboard Hot 100. "Da' Dip" was then certified gold by the RIAA on April 10, 1997 before reaching platinum certification on June 3 of that year for shipments exceeding one million copies; the single sold one million units in 1997 alone.

Single track listing
"Da' Dip" (Clean) – 3:52
"Down Low" (Clean Remix) – 4:23
"Bump That Rump" (Clean Remix) – 3:43
"Da' Dip" (Instrumental) – 3:52

Charts

Certifications

In other media
In 2008, the song was referenced by Jib Kidder on "Windowdipper". See also States Rights Records.
In 2012, the song was parodied in a commercial for Hefty's ZooPals paper plates.
In 2013, the song was sampled by Danny Brown for his song "Dip" from his album Old.
In 2017, the song was interpolated by Cardi B for her song "Bodak Yellow", which would go on to peak at #1 on the Billboard Hot 100 in October of the same year.
In 2019, the song was included in “Falling Inn Love” a Netflix film starring Christina Milian.
In 2019, the song was interpolated by Snotty Nose Rez Kids for their song "Boujee Natives".
In 2022, it was parodied by the Arby's fast-food chain in a commercial advertising a new French dip brisket sandwich.

References

1996 debut singles
1996 songs
Freak Nasty songs
Songs about dancing
Songs written by Freak Nasty